Seririt is a district (kecamatan) in the regency of Buleleng in northern Bali, Indonesia. It covers an area of 111.78 km² and has a population of 67,572 at the 2010 Census; the latest official estimate (as at mid 2017) is 72,570.

Its centre of administration is the town of Seririt.

References

Districts of Bali